Jason Thomas (born 20 January 1997) is a Vanuatuan footballer who plays as a defender for Hekari United and the Vanuatu national team. He made his debut for the national team in November 2015 in their 1–1 draw with Fiji. Besides Vanuatu, he has played in Solomon Islands, Fiji, New Zealand, Papua New Guinea, and Cambodia.

Club career

In 2013, he joined Nayland College.

In 2015, he signed for Phnom Penh Crown.

In 2017, he signed for Solomon Warriors.

In 2020, he signed for Lautoka after receiving interest from Ba.

International career

Prior to his 2015 debut against Fiji for the senior national team, Thomas previously featured five times for the U-17 team at the 2013 OFC U-17 Championship where he scored twice, once salvaging a draw in their opening match against Papua New Guinea and once in a 3–1 victory against New Caledonia in their final group match.

He was later called up to the Vanuatu national under-20 football team for the 2014 OFC U-20 Championship, where he played in four matches: a 1–0 victory over New Caledonia, a 0–0 draw with the Solomon Islands in the following group match, a 4–0 victory over American Samoa, where he was named as captain and a 2–2 draw with Fiji.

2016
In 2016 Thomas participated with the Vanuatu under-20 team in the 2016 OFC U-20 Championship. Vanuatu reached a second place which meant they qualified for the 2017 FIFA U-20 World Cup.

References

External links
 

1997 births
Living people
Vanuatuan footballers
Association football defenders
Vanuatu international footballers
Phnom Penh Crown FC players
Erakor Golden Star F.C. players
2016 OFC Nations Cup players
Expatriate footballers in Cambodia
Vanuatuan expatriate sportspeople in Cambodia
Vanuatu youth international footballers
Vanuatu under-20 international footballers
People educated at Nayland College